is a 1999 Japanese kaiju film directed by Shusuke Kaneko, with special effects by Shinji Higuchi. Produced by Daiei Film and distributed by Toho, the film is the 11th entry in the Gamera film series, as well as the third film in the franchise's Heisei period, serving as a sequel to the 1996 film Gamera 2: Attack of Legion.

The film stars Ai Maeda as Ayana Hirasaka, a young girl who forms a psychic bond with a parasitic creature known as Iris that feeds upon the hatred that she feels for the giant turtle monster Gamera, who had unwittingly killed Ayana's parents. The film also features Shinobu Nakayama and Ayako Fujitani reprising their roles as Mayumi Nagamine and Asagi Kusanagi, respectively. Hirofumi Fukuzawa portrays Gamera, while Akira Ohashi, who played Gamera in the previous film, portrays Iris.

Gamera 3: Revenge of Iris was screened at the 1999 Toronto International Film Festival, and received the Mainichi Film Concours award for Best Sound Recording in Japan. The film received generally positive reviews, with the film's special effects being lauded, and with many praising it as being one of the best entries in the Gamera film series.

Plot
Three years have passed since Gamera defeated Legion and the world is once again plagued by Gyaos, which have now evolved into Hyper Gyaos. Mayumi Nagamine, noted ornithologist, returns to aid the Japanese government in addressing this threat. A graveyard of Gamera fossils is found at the bottom of the sea. Shadowy government agents, occultist Miss Asakura and Kurata Shinya, are meanwhile working with a different agenda, with Asakura believing Gamera to be an evil spirit.

A pair of enhanced 'Hyper' Gyaos appear in Tokyo's Shibuya district, but are opposed by Gamera. During the ensuing battle, Gamera attacks the Gyaos with little regard for humans, killing 20,000 people in the process and causing the Japanese government to order Gamera's immediate destruction. Meanwhile, a young girl named Ayana, whose parents were inadvertently killed by Gamera during his previous battle with Gyaos in 1995, discovers a stone egg sealed within her village temple. The egg hatches a small tentacled creature, whom the girl names "Iris" after her dead pet cat. Iris forms a link with Ayana through an orichalcum pendant and becomes the focus of Ayana's quest for revenge as she seeks to raise her own monster and take vengeance against Gamera. Iris, however, attempts to absorb Ayana in the process of his growth. The girl's classmate manages to free her from Iris' cocoon, but it leaves its lair and kills half of the village's populace, subsequently growing into its adult form. The military attempts to destroy it, but fails.

Iris flies toward the city of Kyoto, where Ayana has been taken by Asakura and Kurata, with Asakura deliberately trying to use the girl to summon Iris. While en route, Iris attempts to kill two pilots of the JASDF, but is intercepted in mid-flight by Gamera and the two engage in an aerial battle. The pilots, under instruction to destroy Gamera should he appear again, force Gamera to descend with a tactical missile strike, inadvertently allowing Iris to escape. Nagamine and Asagi, the girl once psychically linked with Gamera, retrieve Ayana and attempt unsuccessfully to get her out of Kyoto. Kurata speculates that Gamera was engineered as Humanity's guardian, and as such is a "vessel" capable of being charged with humanity's collective "mana", and expresses a belief that therefore Iris had been deliberately created to defeat Gamera so the Gayos (acting akin a planetary immune system) could wipe out the human race. Although they don't share Kurata's misanthropy, Nagamine and Asagi think that the mana theory explains from where Gamera got the energy he used to defeat Legion.

The two monsters meet and continue their fight, but Iris easily gains the upper hand, impaling Gamera and leaving him for dead. Iris then makes its way to Kyoto Station and absorbs Ayana, killing Asakura and Kurata in the process. From within Iris' body, Ayana experiences the creature's memories and realizes that her hatred and bitterness have motivated it. Just as she has her epiphany, Gamera plunges his hand deep into Iris' chest and wrenches the girl free, robbing Iris of its human merge. Miss Nagamine and Asagi, trapped within the train station's wreckage, watch helplessly as Iris impales Gamera's hand and begins to syphon his blood, creating fireballs with its tentacles after processing his DNA. Gamera blasts off his injured hand and absorbs Iris's fireballs, forming a fiery plasma fist, which he drives into Iris' wounded chest.

Iris explodes, blowing the roof off the crumbling train station. The comatose Ayana still clutched in his fist, Gamera sets the girl down where Nagamine and Asagi are hiding. The women are unable to revive her, but Gamera lets out a roar and Ayana awakens. Gamera leaves the girl wondering why he would save her life after all that she had done. A swarm of Gyaos, thousands strong, begins to descend on Japan intent on destroying their greatest foe once and for all. Military leaders finally realize that Gamera is on the side of humanity and pledge to fight the Gyaos horde alongside him. Asagi says that, although she doesn't share a psychic link with Gamera anymore, she knows he will not back down and will fight 'til the end. As the swarm approaches, Gamera lets out a final roar of defiance as he stands his ground in the center of a blazing city.

Cast

 Shinobu Nakayama as Mayumi Nagamine: one of the main characters of the series. Mayumi is a scientist who is intrigued by Gamera, and forms a partnership with Asagi due to the latter's past experiences with the monster.
 Ai Maeda as Ayana Hirasaka / Young Ayana: a tormented young girl whose parents were unintentionally killed by Gamera's previous feud with Gyaos. She forms a bond with Iris and her rage fuels the creature's appetite for destruction.
 Ayako Fujitani as Asagi Kusanagi: Gamera's former human companion, who sacrificed their bond during his fight with Legion three years earlier.
 Senri Yamasaki as Mito Asakura: a sadistic woman who believes that Gamera is an evil spirit bent on destruction and that Iris is the key to his downfall.
 Toru Tezuka as Shinya Kurata: a mysterious man who claims to be a descendant of the advanced civilization that created Gamera and Gyaos.
 Takasaki Nayami as GF Colonel Takoshi: the colonel of the Japanese Self-Defense Force.
 Hakosaki Sato as GF General
 Kenji Soto as Dr. Sato
 Yukijirō Hotaru as Inspector Osako4
 Yūsuke Kawazu as Akio Nojiri
 Hirotarō Honda as Masaaki Saitō
 Masahiko Tsugawa as Commander in Chief of the Air Defence Command (Lieutenant General)
 Hirofumi Fukuzawa as Gamera: the film's titular kaiju, Gamera is a giant, ancient fire-breathing turtle created to destroy the Gyaos, a race of vampiric bird-like creatures
 Akira Ohashi as Iris: the film's main kaiju antagonist, Iris is a creature that must feed on bodily fluids to survive and forms a spiritual bond with Ayana, using her hatred for Gamera to feed its strength
 Kei Horie as Shigeki Hinohara: Ayana's cousin
 Yukie Nakama as Female Camper

Production

Many members of the crew who worked on Gamera 3: Revenge of Iris had previous work in the Gamera film series. Director Shusuke Kaneko directed both Gamera the Guardian of the Universe (1995) and Gamera 2: Attack of Legion (1996). Gamera 3 marks the first Gamera film that Kaneko had screenwriting credits on as he co-wrote the film with Kazunori Ito who had previously written the previous two 1990s Gamera films. The music composer Kow Otani and special effects director Shinji Higuchi was also a regular with the series, previously working on both films.

Release
Gamera 3: Revenge of Iris was released in Japan on March 6, 1999. The film grossed over $15,000,000 on its release. The film had its North American premiere at G-Fest in 1999 and was also shown at the 1999 Toronto Film Festival. The film did not have a wide release in North America and was released direct-to-video on DVD on June 10, 2003, by ADV Films. The film was released on Blu-ray by Mill Creek Entertainment on September 27, 2011.

Gamera 3: Revenge of Iris was followed up by Gamera the Brave directed by Ryuta Tasaki in 2006. The film's plot ignores the events of the three films directed by Kaneko.

Reception
In Japan, Gamera 3: Revenge of Iris won the award for Best Sound Recording at the 54th Mainichi Film Concours ceremony.

Western reviewers praised the film as one of the best in the Gamera series commenting on the special effects in the film. Variety stated the film was "somewhat more elaborate" and "grittier and hipper" than Gamera the Guardian of the Universe (1995) and Gamera 2: Attack of Legion (1996) as well stating that the monster Gamera appeared "more threatening". Variety also described the special effects in the film as "good by model/miniature/animated standards" but felt that were not up to the standards of American special effects. The San Francisco Chronicle felt the film's plot was similar to an episode of The X-Files and praised the special effects in the film opining that "The special effects are terrific, although the monsters still look like guys in rubber suits. Fans of the genre wouldn't have it any other way." Film critic Tom Mes referred to the film as the best Gamera film to date, opining that the film "delivers everything a movie about huge, fighting, city-stomping monsters should have: excitement, slam-bang action sequences, beautifully designed creatures, and yes, even stunning special effects" Time felt that the film was stronger than Gamera 2: Attack of Legion, stating the film is stronger "because it has much less Gamera; there's only so much character richness, let alone fun, to be found in shell, teeth, eyes, claws, scales, etc. But the movie has thrills for those who need 'em. Toward the end, a young scientist faces Iris and his doom and, a moment before he dies, screams like a cheerleader at his own immolation: "Oh boy, is this scary? Yes!" I second that notion."

See also

 List of films featuring giant monsters
 List of Japanese films of 1999
 List of science fiction films of the 1990s

Notes

References

Sources

External links

 

1999 films
Films directed by Shusuke Kaneko
Daiei Film films
Toho tokusatsu films
1990s science fiction films
1990s monster movies
Gamera films
Giant monster films
Japanese science fiction films
Kaiju films
Films set in Tokyo
Films set in Kyoto
Films set in Nara Prefecture
Japanese sequel films
Films scored by Kow Otani
1990s Japanese films